Vesna Čitaković (Serbian Cyrillic: Весна Читаковић; born February 3, 1979) is a Serbian former professional volleyball player. 

She was a member and captain of the Women's National Team that won the bronze medal at the 2006 World Championship in Japan and the silver medal at the 2007 European Championship in Belgium and Luxembourg. She signed for OK Crvena Zvezda in 2015, where she will attend to retire. In March 2016, Vesna signed for Volley Bergamo. She retired as a player with Bergamo in 2016.

Personal life
She is married to a Montenegrin football player, Duško Đurišić. Their son, Nikola Đurišić, is a basketball player.

References

FIVB profile

1979 births
Living people
Volleyball players at the 2008 Summer Olympics
Olympic volleyball players of Serbia
Place of birth missing (living people)
Galatasaray S.K. (women's volleyball) players
Serbian women's volleyball players
Eczacıbaşı volleyball players
Sportspeople from Užice
Serbian expatriate sportspeople in Italy
Serbian expatriate sportspeople in Israel
Serbian expatriate sportspeople in Germany
Serbian expatriate sportspeople in Turkey
Serbian expatriate sportspeople in Romania
Serbian expatriate sportspeople in Poland
Expatriate volleyball players in Poland
Expatriate volleyball players in Turkey
Expatriate volleyball players in Israel
Expatriate volleyball players in Italy
Expatriate volleyball players in Germany
Expatriate volleyball players in Romania